Phaecasiophora is a genus of moths belonging to the subfamily Olethreutinae of the family Tortricidae.

Species
Phaecasiophora amoena 
Phaecasiophora astrata 
Phaecasiophora astrosema 
Phaecasiophora attica 
Phaecasiophora auroraegera 
Phaecasiophora basicornis 
Phaecasiophora caelatrix 
Phaecasiophora caryosema 
Phaecasiophora confixana 
Phaecasiophora cornigera 
Phaecasiophora curvicosta 
Phaecasiophora decolor 
Phaecasiophora diluta 
Phaecasiophora diserta 
Phaecasiophora ectropa 
Phaecasiophora euchlanis 
Phaecasiophora fernaldana 
Phaecasiophora finitimana 
Phaecasiophora inspersa 
Phaecasiophora jubilans 
Phaecasiophora kurokoi 
Phaecasiophora leechi 
Phaecasiophora levis 
Phaecasiophora lushina 
Phaecasiophora maculosana 
Phaecasiophora niveiguttana 
Phaecasiophora obraztsovi 
Phaecasiophora pertexta 
Phaecasiophora pyragra 
Phaecasiophora roseana 
Phaecasiophora rufata 
Phaecasiophora similithaiensis 
Phaecasiophora supparallelica 
Phaecasiophora thaiensis 
Phaecasiophora turmaria 
Phaecasiophora variabilis 
Phaecasiophora walsinghami

See also
List of Tortricidae genera

References

External links
tortricidae.com

Olethreutini
Tortricidae genera